is a Japanese manga artist born June 10, 1958, in Kashiwazaki, Niigata Prefecture, Japan.

His debut manga was Sannen Kimen-gumi, published in Weekly Shōnen Jump beginning in 1980. After Sannen ended in 1982, he began publishing Highschool! Kimen-gumi, also in Weekly Shōnen Jump, until 1987. Highschool was a smash hit, and an animated version was begun in 1985, running for two years on Fuji TV, along with a movie in 1986 and two video games. After Shitataka, Shinzawa took a break from publishing manga until 2001, when his current series, Flash! Kimen-gumi began.

Reception
Shinzawa's High School! Kimengumi has been called "the funniest manga I have ever read" by Michael Gombos, director of Asian marketing for Dark Horse.

References

1958 births
Living people
Manga artists from Niigata Prefecture